Jamakhandi is a city in Bagalkot district in the Indian state of Karnataka. It was the capital of the former princely state of Jamkhandi. It is located 90 km towards west from District headquarter.  It is the first princely state to merge in constituent India based on demand to make Jamkhandi as a district. It is a subdivision of the district. Mudhol, Bilagi, Rabakavi-Banahatti, Teradal and Jamakhandi taluks come under Jamakhandi subdivision.

The city is located near to the Krishna river. A city with a sense of history and confluence of the Maratha and Kannada cultures. It is education hub of the district. It was a princely state, the territory included Kundagol taluk of present day Dharwar district.it is the education hub of the district.

Demographics 

 India census, Jamakhandi had a population of 68,398. Males constitute 50% of the population and females 50%. Jamkhandi has an average literacy rate of 60%: male literacy is 67%, and female literacy is 52%. In Jamakhandi, 14% of the population is under 6 years of age. The population of Jamakhandi is quite diverse one in terms of religion, language and culture. Kannada is the main language.

Attractions
The Royal Palace of Patwardhans is the main attraction of Jamkhandi town. There is a legend says that Sage Jambhu meditated in the "khandi" meaning cave in the hills that gave the city the name. There is reference of the  court poet of the ganga dynasty Ranna, referring to the city as "jambukhandi". There is also a temple of Lord Jambhukeshwara in the city.

Notable people
 B. G. Kher First Chief Minister of Bombay State
 Vitthal Ramji Shinde was a prominent campaigner on behalf of the Dalit movement in India who established the Depressed Classes Mission of India to provide education to the Dalits.
 B. D. Jatti former Vice president of India
 Dr. M C Modi is great Indian eye surgeon. He pursued his early education in P B Highschool. He is believed to have performed a record half-a-million (five-lakh) eye surgeries. He travelled to remote villages and towns of India to hold mass eye camps. He was known for his dexterity as a surgeon and diagnostic acumen.[2]
Gurudev R.D. Ranade is Great mystic and saint. He also pursued his early education in Jamakhandi.

Education

There are 6 Govt. Divisional level Colleges/Offices (CTE's) in Karnataka. Govt. College of Teacher Education, Jamakhandi (CTE, Jamakhandi) is one of them. It is started in the year of 1964–65. Joint Director level officer as a Principal, 3 DDPI's as a Readers and 13 BEO are working as lecturers in this college. (It Covers Five Districts Educational Administration and Conducting Inservice Training Programmes for High School Teachers, Head Masters and Educational Officers) and also well known schools in Jamkhandi are: Govt.P. B. High School: Founder, Sir Parashuram Bhaurao Patwardhan started P. B. High School (named after him) in the year 1879. He also later founded S. P. College in Pune. Government Govt. Girls High School and B.E.S.P.U. College, Kadapatti. Jain AGM Institute of Technology (Jain engineering college), B.L.D.E's Commerce, B.H.S Arts and T.G.P Science. Girish nagar primary Kannada medium school, Nutana primary Kannada medium Vidyalaya, Olimath primary Kannada medium School, Swami Vivekananda School, Tungal schools founded by  Ashok Tungal. The Royal Palace School.No donation higher Primary school which is run by Sarvodaya Mahila & Gramina Abhivruddi Samsthe (R) Jamakhandi.

A Sarvodaya deaf and Dumb School is also run by the same organisation. The city has a big polo ground, where taluka, district and state level sports activities are held. Every year flag hoisting is done in polo ground where students from different schools will gather and perform different kawayats.

History

Jamkhandi State was one of the Maratha princely states of British India. It was founded in 1811 and its capital was at Jamakhandi. It was administered as part of the Deccan States Agency of the Bombay Presidency and was one of the former states of the Southern Maratha Country.

Jamkhandi State was founded in 1811 by Shrimant Gopalrao Patwardhan. He was a descendant of Bramhibhoot Harbhat Buva Patwardhan of Kurandvad Senior State.

The name of the state was derived from Jambukeshwar temple. The temple itself got the name because it was deep inside a Jambul blueberry (Jambul in Marathi, Nerale Hannu in Kannada, Jamun in Hindi) forest. Today, a primary school functions from the temple precinct.

The town of Kundgol, which is in the neighboring Dharwar district, was a non-contiguous part of Jamkhandi State until it merged into the Indian Union on 19 February 1948.

Rulers
The rulers of the state bore the title 'Raja'. The Rajas of Jamkhandi belonged to the Patwardhan dynasty.

The rulers of Jamkhandi State were of the Chitpavan Brahmin caste, originally from the Kotawada in Ratnagiri. Haribhat, who was the family priest of another Chitpavan Brahmin, the chief of Ichalkaranji. Three of Haribhat's sons served Peshwa and distinguished themselves during various conquests. The Peshwa awarded them Jagirs of Jamkhandi, Tasgaon, Miraj, Sangli and Kurundwad, to honor their bravery and courage.

Jamkhandi State was one of the Maratha Princely States of British India and was administered as part of the Bombay Presidency, later by the Deccan States Agency. Jamkhandi was founded by Gopalrao Ramchandrarao Patwardhan (1799-1840) in 1811. He was succeeded by Ramchandrarao Gopalrao Patwardhan (1833-1897), who was a very capable administrator, and moved his capital to Ramtirth, a hill near Jamkhandi, next to an old temple.
https://www.prajavani.net/artculture/art/jamakhandi-633849.html

Kings

(1799 – 1811) Shrimat Gopala Rao Patwardhan
(1811 – 1840) Gopal Rao Ramchandra Rao Patwardhan
(18 Nov 1840 – 1897) Ramchandra Rao Gopal Rao a.k.a. Appa Sahib Patwardhan
(1897 – 25 Feb 1924) Parashuram Rao Ramchandra Rao a.k.a. Bhav Sahib Patwardhan
(25 Feb 1924 – 15 Aug 1947) Shankar Rao Parashuram Rao a.k.a. Appa Sahib Patwardhan (b. 1906)

Cycling
Almost all Karnataka's cycling champions are all from Bijapur district. C.M. Kurni of Jamakhandi can be called the father of cycling in the district. It is to be noted that 90% of the cycling players are from Jamakhandi and neighboring places. As the local people say, milk vendors of Jamakhandi and neighbouring places, while going on their cycles for milk vending developed competitive spirit and converted their cycling skills into a sport. They have participated at state and national cycling competitions and have won many laurels. Chandru Kurni of Kumbaraalla in Jamakhandi taluk was an Internationally acclaimed cyclist and is now a coach.

Sugar industries 
As sugar cane is a major crop in this region, Jamkhandi is surrounded by sugar factories. Shri Prabhulingeshwar sugars are located near Siddapur. Saipriya Sugars is located near Maiguru, Jamkhandi sugars is located near Naganur, Sovereign Industries Ltd, Terdal and

See also
 Jamkhandi Taluka

References

External links 
 Genealogy of the ruling princes of Jamkhandi state

Cities and towns in Bagalkot district